Hsieh Hsi-en 謝喜恩 (born 29 September 1994) is a Taiwanese athlete from Yuli, Hualien.

She reached the semifinals at the Athletics at the Athletics at the 2017 Summer Universiade – Women's 100 metres hurdles but didn't make it through the heats at Athletics at the 2019 Summer Universiade – Women's 100 metres hurdles.

She was sixth at the 2019 Asian Athletics Championships – Women's 100 metres hurdles, eighth at the Athletics at the 2018 Asian Games – Women's 100 metres hurdles and represented Chinese Taipei at the 2020 Summer Olympics in the 2020 Olympics Women's 100 metres, for which the country received a Universality place. 

She is a student at National Taiwan Normal University.

References

External links

1994 births
Living people
Taiwanese female hurdlers
Asian Games competitors for Chinese Taipei
Athletes (track and field) at the 2018 Asian Games
Competitors at the 2017 Summer Universiade
Competitors at the 2019 Summer Universiade
Athletes (track and field) at the 2020 Summer Olympics
Olympic athletes of Taiwan